Serious Magic Incorporated is a software company based in Folsom, California, founded in 2001. It was targeted towards making of video software and communications tools for creative professional, business, consumer, and education markets. Its products included DV Rack, a direct-to-disk field recording and monitoring application, and Visual Communicator, and Vlog It!, a video blogging tool.

On October 19, 2006, Adobe Systems acquired Serious Magic Inc. and its line of products.

References

American companies established in 2001
Software companies established in 2001
2001 establishments in California
2006 mergers and acquisitions
Defunct software companies of the United States
Companies based in Sacramento County, California
Folsom, California
Adobe Inc.